The Carina Rugby League Football Club, commonly known as the Carina Tigers, was formed at the St Pauls Convent in 1958.

Carina Tigers competes in the Brisbane Rugby League and the Brisbane Second Division Rugby League with the club playing out of Leo Williams Oval, Creek Road in Carina, Queensland.

In 1958 Jack Donnelly registered the Easts Carina JRLFC, Half way through the season. In that first year, two teams (Under 14 and Under 16) played in an unofficial capacity against whichever sides had byes.

In 1959, Easts Carina was officially recognised and their two teams played their first fixtures. The first Committee was established and consisted of Jack Donnelly (President), Norm Moore (Secretary), Garth Midgley (Treasurer), Bruce Broomfield, Dale Coogan, Tom Cooper and Leo Hyman.

1960, Easts Carina represented in three age groups (Under 14, 15 and 17) and the club advanced to four teams in 1961. The club Emblem of a Panther’s head between goal posts was initiated in this year.

In 1962, the club was able to play fixtures in its own home ground, situated on the Allan Ramsey Oval, adjacent to the Carina Bowls Club. Dressing sheds and a canteen were built in August 1962, to replace the tents which were originally used as dressing sheds which was a sign of development within the club and was a huge step up at the time.

The 1966 and 1967 seasons saw Easts Carina getting bigger and stronger and in 1968 the club's new ground, the Leo Williams Field (The site of the club's main field today) came into being with the dressing sheds and canteen situated under the old Chadwick Hall.

A second oval was opened in 1972 (Ted Johns Field) to initially be used as a training venue but in 2007 it was upgraded to allow games to be played on. In 1973 the existing clubhouse was built and the First tour to Souths Mackay would occur.

In 1979 the club changed its emblem from the Panther which has been the emblem for the club since 1961 to the Tiger which is still the current emblem today.

The 1996 season saw the opening of the current dressing sheds and the erection of the Media box on top of the grandstand which stood until being replaced with the current grandstand in 2004.

The 2004 season saw the beginning of our partnership with the Brisbane Broncos NRL club, with first Paul Green and now Michael Devere being employed as Development Managers for the club.

The club celebrated its 50th year in 2008 culminating with a 50th Anniversary dinner where a team of the past 50 years was named and presented. In 2012 the Carina Old Boys Association was formed with its clubhouse situated next to the junior clubhouse.

The 2013 season saw a total of 33 teams across 15 grades and proudly, 4 premiership graded teams in 2013 from U6 teams right through to Opens and Womens.

The 2015 Season saw a total of 32 Junior Teams across 12 Grades consisting of 5 Premiership Grades. Senior Teams were U20, Open Premiers and Southside 2,  A Grade and Women’s.

2016 - 35 Junior Teams consisting of 5 Premiership Grade Teams. 4 Senior Teams, A Grade, Premier Grade, Southside 2 and Senior Women's. Chairman's Trophy Winners, U11 Premier, U13 Premier and U14 Division 3. 8 Players represented SEQ and 1 Player represented Australia.

2017 – The club celebrated its 60th Jubilee with a dinner at Shangri-La Gardens. The club changed its emblem to a Panther and Tiger. The 2017 Season was the start of Registrations and Payments becoming online only. Demolition of our 1973 Clubhouse started on Monday 18thSeptember in preparation for a new clubhouse. On the field we saw 31 Junior Teams consisting of 5 Premiership Grades and 3 Senior Teams being Open Premier Grade, Open Southside 2 and Senior Women Division 2.

2018– We were handed the keys to our new Kev Buckmaster Clubhouse on Friday 2 March. Peter Phillips from the Carina Leagues Club officiated the opening on Saturday 23 June. We fielded 33 Junior Teams consisting of 4 Premier Grade Teams and 2 Senior Men Teams being Open Reserve Grade and Open Southside 2.

Other information 
With it being the 61st year of the Carina Junior Rugby league club, the club has seen successful growth over the past 61 years of operation and now has a number of teams ranging from the age groups of under 6 to adults.

Throughout the years, the Carina Rugby League Club has managed to gather a     Number of Sponsors that heavily support the financial services of the club. Some major sponsors include Carina Leagues Club and Laser plumbing. These are only some of the sponsors that support the club.

References

External links

Rugby clubs established in 1958
1958 establishments in Australia
Rugby league teams in Brisbane